John Ashe may refer to:

John Ashe (minister) (1671–1735), English dissenting minister
John Ashe (of Freshford) (1597–1658), MP for Westbury
John Ashe (priest) (born 1953), Church of England priest and Archdeacon of Lynn
John Ashe (general) (c. 1720–1781), American Revolutionary War figure
John Baptista Ashe (delegate) (1748–1802), North Carolina delegate to the Continental Congress
John Baptista Ashe (representative) (1810–1857), U.S. Congressman from Tennessee
John William Ashe (1954–2016), President of the sixty-eighth session of the United Nations General Assembly

See also
John Ayshe, MP for Wells
John Ash (disambiguation)